The Islamic Azad University, Meymeh Branch is a university in the town of Meymeh in Isfahan Province, Iran. It is a branch of the Islamic Azad University, one of the largest universities in the world.

References

Meymeh, Islamic Azad University of
Buildings and structures in Isfahan Province
Education in Isfahan Province